Augustus S. Tyron House, also known as the Tryon-Prentice-Powers House, is a historic home located at Le Roy, Genesee County, New York. It was built in 1867, and is a two-story, Italianate style frame dwelling with a recessed two-story wing.  It features a hipped roof with overhanging eaves and brackets, bay window with second story porch, and a full-width, one-story porch, also with decorative brackets.

It was listed on the National Register of Historic Places in 2013.

References

Houses on the National Register of Historic Places in New York (state)
Italianate architecture in New York (state)
Houses completed in 1890
Buildings and structures in Genesee County, New York
National Register of Historic Places in Genesee County, New York